Chaetomorpha melagonium is a species of green algae of the family Cladophoraceae.

There is confusion as to whether there are two forms of this species - one attached and one unattached.

Description

The attached form is unbranched growing solitary or in a small group to 60 cm long. The filaments are attached at the base and are stiff and straight. In colour they are dark green with a glaucus sheen. Remarkably rigid and wiry. The cells are so large they can seen with naked eye.

Habitat
Rock pools of the low littoral. Never abundant, but widespread.

Distribution
Widespread around the British Isles, along the Atlantic shores of Europe, Murman Sea, Greenland, Canadian Arctic.

References

Cladophoraceae
Plants described in 1845
Taxa named by Friedrich Traugott Kützing